Hár is a crater on Jupiter's moon Callisto. Its name is one of the many names of Odin, the supreme god in Norse mythology. This is an example of a central dome impact crater.

References

Surface features on Callisto (moon)
Impact craters on Jupiter's moons